John Hurt may refer to

 John Hurt, actor
 Mississippi John Hurt, musician
 John L. Hurt, politician
 John Hurt (chaplain)

See also 
 John Hurt Fisher, literary scholar and medievalist